BC Körmend, named Egis Körmend for sponsorship reasons, is a Hungarian professional basketball club, based in Körmend. The club was founded in 1962 and has won the domestic championship three times (1987, 1996, 2003) and the domestic cup seven times (1990, 1993–1995, 1997, 1998, 2016).

Sponsorship names
Körmendi FMTE (1962–1981)
Körmendi Dózsa MTE (1982–1990) 
Körmend-Hunor KC (1990–1994)
Marc-Körmend (1995–2005)
Polaroid–Lami-Véd Körmend (2005–2009)
MJUS-Fortress Körmend (2009–2012)
Lami-Véd Körmend (2012–2014) 
Ingoknito Fashion Körmend (2013–2014; European competitions)
Egis Körmend (2014–present)

Honours 
Nemzeti Bajnokság I/A
Champions (3): 1986–87, 1995–96, 2002–03
Runners-up (4): 1989–90, 1996–97, 2001–02, 2006–07, 2007–08

Hungarian Cup 
 Winners (7): 1990, 1993, 1994, 1995, 1997, 1998, 2016
Runners-up (2): 1999, 2007

Alpe Adria Cup:
Winners (1): 2018–19

Season by season

 Cancelled due to the COVID-19 pandemic in Hungary.

Current roster

Notable players

Head coaches
 Teo Čizmić (2014-2016)
 Gašper Potočnik (2016–2018)
 Matthias Zollner (2018–2020)
 Žiga Mravljak (2020–2021)
 Antonis Constantinides (2021–present)

References

External links 
 Official website
 Team history (1992-1999) in fibaeurope.com
 Team history (2009) in fibaeurope.com

Basketball teams in Hungary